Saint-Bonnet-sur-Gironde is a commune in the Charente-Maritime department in the Nouvelle-Aquitaine region in southwestern France. It is situated on the right (east) bank of the river Gironde.

Population

See also
Communes of the Charente-Maritime department

References

Communes of Charente-Maritime
Charente-Maritime communes articles needing translation from French Wikipedia